The 1949 Singapore Open, also known as the 1949 Singapore Badminton Championships, took place from 25 September – 17 December 1949 at the Clerical Union Hall in Balestier, Singapore. The ties were played over a few months with the first round ties being played on the 25 of September and last few matches (the men's singles and women's doubles finals) were played on the 17th of December.

The championships were open to all-comers and not just Singapore residents.

Venue
Clerical Union Hall

Final results

References 

Singapore Open (badminton)
1949 in badminton